This is a list of Scottish Statutory Instruments in order of their SSI number.

1999–2009

1999
List of Statutory Instruments of Scotland, 1999

2000
List of Statutory Instruments of Scotland, 2000

2001
List of Statutory Instruments of Scotland, 2001

2002
List of Statutory Instruments of Scotland, 2002

2003
List of Statutory Instruments of Scotland, 2003

2004
List of Statutory Instruments of Scotland, 2004

2005
List of Statutory Instruments of Scotland, 2005

2006
List of Statutory Instruments of Scotland, 2006

2007
List of Statutory Instruments of Scotland, 2007

2008
List of Statutory Instruments of Scotland, 2008

2009
List of Statutory Instruments of Scotland, 2009

2010–present

2010
List of Statutory Instruments of Scotland, 2010

2011
List of Statutory Instruments of Scotland, 2011

2012
List of Statutory Instruments of Scotland, 2012

2013
List of Statutory Instruments of Scotland, 2013

2014
List of Statutory Instruments of Scotland, 2014

2015
List of Statutory Instruments of Scotland, 2015

2016
List of Statutory Instruments of Scotland, 2016

2017
List of Statutory Instruments of Scotland, 2017

2018
List of Statutory Instruments of Scotland, 2018

2019
List of Statutory Instruments of Scotland, 2019

2020
List of Statutory Instruments of Scotland, 2020

2021
List of Statutory Instruments of Scotland, 2021

2022
List of Statutory Instruments of Scotland, 2022

2023
List of Statutory Instruments of Scotland, 2023

 
Statutory Instruments
Statutory Instruments
Statutory Instruments